Gabi Na, Kumander is a 1986 Philippine action film edited and directed by Pepe Marcos. The film stars Phillip Salvador and Dindo Fernando. The film is based on a popular radio drama. It also marks the film debut of Monsour del Rosario.

The film is streaming online on YouTube.

Cast
Phillip Salvador as Comm. Cobra
Dindo Fernando as Ramil
Bembol Roco as Diego
Efren Reyes Jr. as Lt. Carruncho
Anna Marie Gutierrez as Comm. Magdalena
Jaclyn Jose as Mayeng
Sarsi Emmanuelle as Geraldine
Dindo Arroyo as Homer
Eddie Garcia as Gen. Benitez
Tony Santos as Apo Layug
Lito Pimentel as Kampay
Ikay Aldanese as Ilay

Awards

References

External links

Full Movie on Viva Films

1986 films
1986 action films
Filipino-language films
Philippine action films
Viva Films films
Films directed by Pepe Marcos